K-1 World MAX 2006 World Championship Final was a kickboxing event promoted by the K-1 organization.  It was the fifth K-1 World MAX final for middleweight kickboxers (70 kg/154 lb weight class), involving eight finalists and two reserve fighters, with all bouts fought under K-1 rules.  Seven of the finalists had won elimination fights at the K-1 World MAX 2005 World Tournament Open, while the eighth, Virgil Kalakoda, had been invited despite losing his elimination match.  The two reserve fighters had qualified via preliminary tournaments; Artur Kyshenko had won the K-1 East Europe MAX and Rayen Simson had won the K-1 MAX Netherlands.  As well as tournament matches there were also a two opening fights and two super fights fought under K-1 rules (middleweight and heavyweight).  In total there were eighteen fighters at the event, representing nine countries.  

The tournament was won by Buakaw Por. Pramuk who defeated Andy Souwer in the final.  Prior to the tournament both fighters had stated their intention to be the first fighter to win two K-1 MAX finals, with Buakaw becoming the first two time champion defeating Souwer via KO in the second round of their match.  Other results saw Muay Thai world champion Yodsanklai Fairtex defeat SuperLeague starlet Kamal El Amrani and Kenpo Karate expert Fernando Calleros defeated local fighter Kozo Takeda, both by decision.  The event was held at the Yokohama Arena in Yokohama, Japan on Friday, 30 June 2006, in front of a sellout crowd of 16,918 and was broadcast live across Japan on TBS.

K-1 World MAX 2006 World Championship Final Tournament

* Virgil Kalakoda was invited to the Final despite his elimination fight defeat

Results

See also
List of K-1 events
List of K-1 champions
List of male kickboxers

References

External links
K-1 Official Website
K-1sport.de - Your Source for Everything K-1

K-1 MAX events
2006 in kickboxing
Kickboxing in Japan
Sport in Yokohama